The ninth season of American Dad! debuted on the Fox network on September 30, 2012, at 9:30/8:30c, and concluded on May 12, 2013.

Guest stars for the season include Wayne Brady, Alison Brie, Sean Hayes, Mariah Carey, Charlie Day, Michelle Dockery, Nathan Fillion, Will Forte, Sarah Michelle Gellar, Rupert Grint, Jon Hamm, and Shaun White.

Episode plots include Jeff discovering Roger is an alien and being stranded on an alien space ship in a two-episode story arc ("Naked to the Limit, One More Time", "Lost in Space"), Klaus finding his human body, then switching with Stan's ("Da Flippity Flop"), Roger becoming Stan's stepfather ("American Stepdad") and Hayley getting a job as a bar singer for Roger ("Love, AD Style").

The episode "Minstrel Krampus" was scheduled to air on December 16, 2012, but was replaced by a repeat of "Wheels & the Legman and the Case of Grandpa's Key" out of sensitivity for the Sandy Hook Elementary School shooting. To compensate for this, they aired the episode "National Treasure 4: Baby Franny: She's Doing Well: The Hole Story" early. "Minstrel Krampus" eventually aired in the tenth season.


Episode list

References

2012 American television seasons
2013 American television seasons